Southend railway station may refer to one of four railway stations in Southend-on-Sea, England:

 Southend Airport railway station on the Shenfield to Southend Line
 Southend Central railway station on the London, Tilbury and Southend line
 Southend East railway station on the London, Tilbury and Southend line
 Southend Victoria railway station on the Shenfield to Southend Line